The cheat minnow (Pararhinichthys bowersi) is a demersal, freshwater fish endemic to the United States, most commonly found in the Ohio River basin.  It is the only species in the genus Pararhinichthys. Its taxonomic status is debatable and Pararhinichthys bowersi is most likely to refer to an F1 hybrid of Rhinichthys cataractae and Nocomis micropogon.

References
 

Leuciscinae
Fish of North America
Fish of the United States
Fish described in 1908